Congeria is a genus of bivalves belonging to the family Dreissenidae.

The species of this genus are found in Europe, the Americas.

Species:

Congeria angustiformis 
Congeria aquitanica 
Congeria balatonica 
Congeria banatica 
Congeria birladensis 
Congeria bittneri 
Congeria bosniaskii 
Congeria brandenburgi 
Congeria brkici 
Congeria byzantica 
Congeria ceratodus 
Congeria dubia 
Congeria dubocaensis 
Congeria flexuosa 
Congeria florianii 
Congeria getica 
Congeria ghergutai 
Congeria grsici 
Congeria gundulici 
Congeria hektorovici 
Congeria hemiptycha 
Congeria homoplatoides 
Congeria ignobilis 
Congeria infantula 
Congeria inflata 
Congeria jalzici 
Congeria kusceri 
Congeria latiuscula 
Congeria leucippe 
Congeria maorti 
Congeria markovici 
Congeria mediocarinata 
Congeria michaudi 
Congeria minor 
Congeria mulaomerovici 
Congeria mytilopsis 
Congeria navicula 
Congeria ninnii 
Congeria nodarii 
Congeria novorossica 
Congeria oppenheimi 
Congeria oxyrhyncha 
Congeria pancici 
Congeria panticapaea 
Congeria partschi 
Congeria praerhomboidea 
Congeria pseudorostriformis 
Congeria rhodanica 
Congeria rhomboidea 
Congeria savuli 
Congeria solitaria 
Congeria spathulata 
Congeria stefanii 
Congeria stiriaca 
Congeria subglobosa 
Congeria subrhomboidea 
Congeria susedana 
Congeria suspecta 
Congeria tacutai 
Congeria touzini 
Congeria transcaucasica 
Congeria vugroveci 
Congeria waehneri 
Congeria zsigmondyi

References

Dreissenidae
Bivalve genera